Tanivka, formerly known as Vovkove, is a village in Berezivka Raion of Odesa Oblast in Ukraine. It belongs to Berezivka urban hromada, one of the hromadas of Ukraine.

Demographics
According to the 1989 census, the population of Tanivka was 173 people, of whom 86 were men and 87 women.

Native language as of the Ukrainian Census of 2001:
 Ukrainian 97.78%
 Russian 2.22%

References

Villages in Berezivka Raion